There are two species of lizard named dusky gliding lizard:
 Draco obscurus, found in Indonesia and Thailand
 Draco formosus, found in Thailand and Malaysia